Divljana is a village in the municipality of Bela Palanka, Serbia. According to the 2002 census, the village has a population of  141 people. Divljana Monastery is one of the landmarks in Divljana.

Zapis 

There is a large, old oak tree in Divljana. It is zapis ("inscription"), a holy village tree. A custom originating in pre-Christian Slavic mythology, a large, usually oak tree, would have a cross carved into its bark, and then it would serve as a temple. Oak trees were sanctified in the settlements which had no church of their own. Experts from the Niš Institute for the natural protection estimated that it sprouted in c. 1400.

The trunk is completely open and hollow on one side. Inside, eight grown persons can fit, or a table and chairs. The tree, which belongs to the species of durmast oak, is placed under the state protection as a natural monument.

References

External links 

Populated places in Pirot District